The Gospel of Corax is a 1996 novel by Paul Park about an escaped Roman slave (Corax) who travels from Caesarea to India with a burly Essene man named Jeshua.

The novel is a suggestion of a historical Jesus' whereabouts during his "disappearance" from the historical record between childhood and his thirties. This is based on the theory (first postulated by Nicolas Notovitch) that the historical Jesus travelled to India.

According to a review in In Newsweekly:
Corax is an ex-slave on the lamb in this interesting first-person narrative.  He lives in Roman society at a time when professional skills – literacy, chemistry, medicine, surgery and astronomy – were sometimes the province of well-kept slaves rather than free citizens.  These same skills serve Corax well in his trek across the ancient Middle East as he plays many roles to keep his freedom and his life.  Whether he's acting as a thief and prostitute or a healer and diplomat, Corax's story is sprinkled with satisfying historical, practical, and metaphysical commentary.

See also

Paul Park
Jesus

References

External links
 http://www.fantasticfiction.co.uk/p/paul-park/gospel-of-corax.htm

1996 novels
Novels by Paul Park
Novelistic portrayals of Jesus
Soho Press books